Diane Anderson-Minshall (born March 19, 1968) is an American journalist and author best known for writing about lesbian, gay, bisexual, and transgender subjects. She is the first female CEO of Pride Media. She is also the editorial director of The Advocate and Chill magazines, the editor-in-chief of HIV Plus magazine, while still contributing editor to OutTraveler. Diane co-authored the 2014 memoir Queerly Beloved about her relationship with her husband Jacob Anderson-Minshall throughout his gender transition.

Biography
Born Diane Anderson is originally from Southern California, she later moved to Payette, Idaho at an early age. Diane is an open Native American LGBTQIA advocate. She is an alum of Tulane University (which she attended 1986–87) and Xavier University of Louisiana (the only Black, Catholic university in the nation, which she attended 1987–88). While working full-time in publishing, she continued taking classes at University of California, Berkeley, Chaffey College, College of San Mateo, and Idaho State University before finishing a weekend B.A. degree completion program at the New College of California.

Diane and her partner Jacob Anderson-Minshall later decided to have another wedding ceremony, celebrating their union as husband and wife after Jacob Anderson-Minshall transitioned from female-to-male.

Career

In 1990, Minshall became the editor of the Crescent City Star, a weekly LGBT newspaper in New Orleans. In 1993, Diane became an editor at On Our Backs, the lesbian erotic magazine founded by Nan Kinney and Debbie Sundahl. A year later, she and fellow On Our Backs employees left the magazine and founded their own publication, the lesbian entertainment magazine Girlfriends. She later became executive editor of Curve. Anderson-Minshall started working for The Advocate in 2011.

During her tenure at Girlfriends and later at other publications including Curve, Anderson-Minshall became known for her celebrity interviews. Dana Plato, Angelina Jolie and singer Sinéad O'Connor "came out" as lesbian or bisexual women in interviews with Anderson-Minshall, although O'Connor and Plato later retracted their statements.

In 1999, Minshall founded the short-lived women's lifestyle magazine, Alice. As a freelance writer, she has been published in dozens of magazines including Passport, Bust, Bitch, Venus, Utne and Seventeen. She became an editor at Curve magazine in 2004 and later became editor-in-chief.

Minshall co-edited the anthology of LGBTQ youth writing, Becoming: Young Ideas on Gender, Race and Sexuality, and her autobiographical essays have appeared in numerous anthologies. Her first solo fiction, Punishment with Kisses was published in 2009.

Minshall co-authored the 2014 memoir Queerly Beloved: A Love Story Across Genders with her husband Jacob Anderson-Minshall. The work focuses on how their relationship survived the transition from lesbian couple to husband and wife. The couple previously collaborated in writing the Blind Eye Detectives mystery series (Blind Curves, Blind Leap and the Lambda Literary Award finalist Blind Faith) through Bold Strokes Books. In 2015 Jacob Anderson-Minshall became the first openly transgender author to win a Goldie award from the Golden Crown Literary Society; he shared the award for best creative non-fiction book with Diane Anderson-Minshall for Queerly Beloved: A Love Story Across Genders.

Minshall was on the Larry King Now show as a special guest talking about HIV in transgender women in 2015. In which she explained why trans woman had a higher rate of HIV than other people in the LGBTQIA community.

Minshall became the editor-at-large of The Advocate and the editor-in-chief of HIV Plus Magazine. In 2018, she helped launched Chill Magazine.

On January 15, 2020, Pride Media announced Diane as its new chief executive officer, the first woman to ever hold the position at the company.

Awards
1998 – Visa Versa award for her celebrity journalism at Girlfriends magazine.
2000 – Exceptional Women in Publishing (EWIP)'s Woman of the Year finalist
2006 – Power Up'''s Ten Amazing Gay Women in Showbiz Award 
2009 – Lambda Literary Award for Lesbian Mystery finalist, Blind Faith 
2010 – GLAAD Media Award for Outstanding Magazine Overall Coverage, The Advocate
2011 – GLAAD Media Award for Outstanding Magazine Overall Coverage, The Advocate
2012 – Excellence in Journalism Award from Northern California Chapter of the National Lesbian and Gay Journalists Association 
2012 – GLAAD Media Award for Outstanding Magazine Overall Coverage, The Advocate
2012 – NLGJA Northern California Chapter Excellence in Journalism Aware
2013 – GLAAD Media Award for Outstanding Magazine Overall Coverage, The Advocate
2013 – LA Pride Osborn/Michaels Media Award, which "honors those who disseminate information to the public for the betterment of the LGBT community in order to raise awareness and fight for equality."
2013 – NLGJA Excellence in HIV/AIDS Coverage Award, Second Place: Diane Anderson-Minshall for a series in HIV Plus Magazine
2014 – GLAAD Media Award for Outstanding Magazine Overall Coverage, The Advocate
2014 – GLAAD Media Award for Outstanding Digital Journalism Article, "Prime Timers: Spotlight on LGBT Seniors" (series), Advocate.com
2014 – The First Annual WPA Awards of Distinction Leadership Award for helping develop the HIV Plus Treatment Guide Mobile App.
2014 – NLGJA Los Angeles Chapter Overall Grand Prize for Excellence in Journalism for coverage of worst mass killing of LGBT people in U.S. History (prior to Orlando mass shooting)
2014 – LA Press Club SoCal Journalism Award for Best Online Feature "Remembering the Worst Mass Killing of LGBT People in U.S. History
2014 – Western Publishing Association Inaugural Maggie Leadership Award for creating the HIV Plus Treatment Guide mobile app
2015 – GLAAD Media Award for Outstanding Digital Journalism Article "31 Days of PrEP" (series), Advocate.com
2015 – NLGJA Excellence in Online Journalism Award, Third Place: Sunnivie Brydum for "40 Under 40: Emerging Voices," The Advocate with Michelle Garcia, Lucas Grindley, Daniel Reynolds, Neal Broverman, Trudy Ring, Jase Peeples, Diane Anderson-Minshall, Parker Marie Molloy, Tracy E. Gilchrist, Annie Hollenbeck, and Thom Senzee
2015 – Shared the award for best creative non-fiction book from the Golden Crown Literary Society with her husband Jacob Anderson-Minshall for the book Queerly Beloved: A Love Story Across Genders.
2015 – Special guest on the Larry King Now show educating the people about why Transgender women are 49% more likely to have HIV. 
2016 – NLGJA Lisa Ben Award for Achievement in Features Coverage
2016 – NLGJA Excellence in Profile Writing Award, First Place: Advocate Staff for "40 Under 40: Intersectional Coverage," The Advocate
2016 – NLGJA Excellence in Social Media Award, First Place: Advocate Staff for "Day in LGBT America," The Advocate
2017 – NLGJA Excellence in Bisexual Coverage Award for "Freddie Mercury's Life Story is the Story of HIV, Bisexuality, and Queer Identity," The Advocate
2018 – NLGJA Sarah Pettit Memorial Award for the LGBTQ Journalist of the Year
2018 – Folio: Eddie and Ozzie Award for Best Editorial Team of the Year
2018 – Folio: Eddie and Ozzie Award for Best New Magazine Launch, Chill

 Works 

FictionBlind Curves New York : Bold Strokes Books, 2005. , Blind Leap, New York, N.Y. : Bold Strokes Books, 2006. , Blind Faith Valley Falls, NY : Bold Strokes, 2008. , Punishment With Kisses Valley Falls, NY : Bold Strokes Books, 2009. , 

NonfictionQueerly Beloved: A Love Story Across Gender Valley Falls, N.Y. : Bold Strokes Books, 2014. , 

AnthologiesReading The L Word: Outing Contemporary TelevisionBitchfest: Ten Years of Cultural Criticism from the Pages of Bitch MagazineBody OutlawsCloser to Home: Bisexuality and FeminismYoung Wives Tales: New Adventures in Love and Partnership50 Ways to Support Lesbian and Gay Equality: The Complete Guide to Supporting Family, Friends, Neighbors or YourselfTough Girls''

References

External links

1968 births
20th-century American non-fiction writers
20th-century American women writers
21st-century American non-fiction writers
21st-century American women writers
American feminist writers
Chaffey College alumni
Idaho State University alumni
College of San Mateo alumni
American LGBT journalists
LGBT people from Idaho
LGBT Native Americans
Bisexual rights activists
Bisexual women
Bisexual memoirists
Living people
New College of California alumni
Tulane University alumni
University of California, Berkeley alumni
Xavier University of Louisiana alumni
People from Payette, Idaho
American women non-fiction writers
21st-century American LGBT people
American bisexual writers